West Coast Hotel Co. v. Parrish, 300 U.S. 379 (1937), was a decision by the United States Supreme Court upholding the constitutionality of state minimum wage legislation. The court's decision overturned an earlier holding in Adkins v. Children's Hospital (1923) and is generally regarded as having ended the Lochner era, a period in American legal history during which the Supreme Court tended to invalidate legislation aimed at regulating business.

The case arose when hotel maid Elsie Parrish sued for the difference between her wages and the minimum wage set by the State of Washington. In his majority opinion, Chief Justice Charles Evans Hughes upheld the law, ruling that the Constitution permitted the restriction of liberty of contract by state law where such restriction protected the community, health and safety, or vulnerable groups. Associate Justice Owen J. Roberts's decision to join the majority in upholding the law after having favored striking down a state minimum wage law in another case has occasionally been referred to as "the switch in time that saved nine" because it occurred during the debate over the Judicial Procedures Reform Bill of 1937.

Facts
Elsie Parrish, a chambermaid working at the Cascadian Hotel in Wenatchee, Washington (owned by the West Coast Hotel Company), along with her husband, sued the hotel for the difference between what she was paid, and the $14.50 per week of 48 hours established as a minimum wage by the Industrial Welfare Committee and Supervisor of Women in Industry, pursuant to Washington state law.  The trial court, using Adkins as precedent, ruled for the defendant. The Washington Supreme Court, taking the case on a direct appeal, reversed the trial court and found in favor of Parrish. The hotel appealed to the U.S. Supreme Court.

Judgment
The Court, in an opinion by Chief Justice Hughes, ruled that the Constitution permitted the restriction of liberty of contract by state law where such restriction protected the community, health and safety, or vulnerable groups, as in the case of Muller v. Oregon, where the Court had found in favor of the regulation of women's working hours. Hughes said the following:

Significance

The West Coast decision heralded the end of the Lochner era, when the US Supreme Court struck down numerous worker and consumer protection laws. During the Lochner era, the Supreme Court's conservative majority held that the Fourteenth Amendment guaranteed a "freedom of contract," which trumped efforts by legislators to protect workers or consumers.

The doctrine continued to inform the Court's decisions through the Great Depression and the beginning of the New Deal, when it invalidated numerous worker and consumer protections. Just months prior to West Coast, a similar minimum wage law from New York was struck down in Morehead v. New York ex rel. Tipaldo. The majority in Morehead consisted of four conservative justices, sometimes called the "Four Horsemen", and a fifth Associate Justice, Owen Josephus Roberts.

In response to the invalidation of so much legislation, President Franklin D. Roosevelt proposed to change the number of Supreme Court justices, which its opponents characterized as the "court-packing plan", his court reform bill was intended to dilute the influence of the older, anti-New Deal justices.

Justice Roberts' vote to uphold the minimum wage law in West Coast Hotel, coming so soon after his vote to strike down a similar minimum wage law in Morehead, was unexpected and derailed Roosevelt's court reform bill. Many contemporary observers think Roberts' vote was a response to Roosevelt's court-packing plan, but Roberts denied it, and the evidence is mixed.

Chief Justice Hughes stated in his autobiographical notes that Roosevelt's proposal to change the composition of  the court "had not the slightest effect on our [the court's] decision" and that the delay in the ruling, which was caused only by Harlan Fiske Stone's absence, led to false speculation that Roosevelt's proposal had intimidated the court into ruling in favor of Washington's minimum wage law. Both Hughes and Roberts also acknowledged that because of the overwhelming support that had been shown for the New Deal through Roosevelt's re-election in November 1936, Hughes was able to persuade Roberts to stop basing his votes on his own political beliefs and to start siding with him during future decisions on New Deal legislation. In one of his notes from 1936, Hughes wrote that Roosevelt's re-election forced the court to depart from "its fortress in public opinion" and severely weakened its capability to base its rulings on personal or political beliefs.

Roberts had voted in favor of Washington State's minimum wage on December 19, 1936, just two days after oral arguments concluded, and the Court was evenly divided only because pro-New Deal Associate Justice Stone was then absent for illness.

Roberts's move was notoriously referred to as "the switch in time that saved nine." Shortly after leaving the Court, Roberts reportedly burned all of his legal and judicial papers. As a result, there is no significant collection of his manuscript papers, unlike for most other modern Justices. Roberts prepared a short memorandum that discussed his alleged change of stance around the time of the court-packing effort, which he left in the hands of Justice Felix Frankfurter. In his dissenting opinion, Associate Justice Sutherland wrote that "the meaning of the Constitution does not change with the ebb and flow of economic events," a remark that has been read as an admonition aimed at Roberts.

See also
 Fair Labor Standards Act of 1938

Notes

External links

Minimum wage law
United States labor case law
United States substantive due process case law
United States Supreme Court cases
United States Supreme Court cases of the Hughes Court
United States Supreme Court decisions that overrule a prior Supreme Court decision
Wenatchee, Washington
1937 in United States case law
Constitutional challenges to the New Deal